Capillipedium (common name scented-tops) is a genus of plants in the grass family. They are native to Africa, Asia, Australia, and certain islands in the Western Pacific.

 Species

 formerly included
see Hemisorghum 
 Capillipedium venustum - Hemisorghum venustum

See also
 List of Poaceae genera

References

External links
 Grassbase - The World Online Grass Flora

Andropogoneae
Poaceae genera